Zurbano in Spanish or Zurbao in Basque is a village in the municipality of Arratzua-Ubarrundia, Álava, Basque Country, Spain. It lies on the northeastern rural outskirts of Vitoria-Gasteiz, 6.5 km from the centre. As of 2002 it had a population of 153.

Notable landmarks
It contains a collection of palace-houses dating from the seventeenth and eighteenth centuries that once belonged to prominent families such as Basterra, Isunza Otalora or Iriarte. Among these the most notable is the Palacio Rural Zurbano, which is a declared monument. The church of St. Stephen dates from the fifteenth century.

Economy
Cereal farming is the traditional local economic activity. There is a bar-restaurant in Zurbano. Celebrations are held the first weekend of September in honor of San Esteban.

References

Populated places in Álava